Vilavila (in Hispanicized spelling) or Wila Wila (Aymara wila red, blood-red, the reduplication signifies that there is a group or a complex of something, "a complex of red color") is one of ten districts of the province Lampa in Peru.

Geography 
Other mountains are listed below:

 Achuqallani
 Llanqirani
 Pukarani
 Salla Pata
 Wallatani
 Wisa Wisa

Ethnic groups 
The people in the district are mainly indigenous citizens of Quechua descent. Quechua is the language which the majority of the population (98.12%) learnt to speak in childhood, 1.25% of the residents started speaking using the Spanish language (2007 Peru Census).

References